G20 2010 may refer to:

 2010 G20 Toronto summit, the G20 summit on 26–27 June 2010 in Toronto, Canada
 2010 G20 Seoul summit, the G20 summit on 11–12 November 2010 in Seoul, South Korea